The 2018–19 South Dakota Coyotes men's basketball team represents the University of South Dakota during the 2018–19 NCAA Division I men's basketball season. The Coyotes, led by first-year head coach Todd Lee, will play their home games at the Sanford Coyote Sports Center in Vermillion, South Dakota as members of the Summit League.

Previous season
The Coyotes finished the 2017–18 season finished the season 26–9, 11–3 in Summit League play to finish in second place. They defeated Omaha and Denver to advance to the championship game of the Summit League where they lost to South Dakota State. They were invited to the College Basketball Invitational where they lost in the first round to North Texas.

Roster

Schedule and results

|-
!colspan=9 style=| Exhibition

|-
!colspan=9 style=| Regular season

|-
!colspan=9 style=| Summit League regular season

|-
!colspan=9 style=| The Summit League tournament

Source

References

South Dakota Coyotes men's basketball seasons
South Dakota
Coyo
Coyo